Dharampur or Dharmpur may refer to:

India
 Dharampur State, a Princely State now in Gujarat
 Dharampur, Gujarat, a city in Gujarat 
 Dharmpur, Mandi, a town in Mandi district, Himachal Pradesh

 Dharampur, Kasauli, a village in Solan district, Himachal Pradesh
 Dharampur, Baddi, a village in Solan district, Himachal Pradesh
 Dharampur, Theog, a village in Shimla district, Himachal Pradesh
 Dharampur, Dahanu in Maharashtra
 Dharampur, Bulandshahr, a town in Uttar Pradesh
 Dharampur, Allahabad, village in Uttar Pradesh
 Dharampur, Bhara, Bishnupur, a village in West Bengal

Constituencies
 Dharampur, Gujarat Assembly constituency
 Dharampur, Himachal Pradesh Assembly constituency
 Dharampur, Uttarakhand Assembly constituency

Nepal
 Dharampur, Jhapa
 Dharampur, Sagarmatha
 Dharampur, Narayani
 Khadga Bhadrakali, Dharampur

See also
 Dharampura